Events in the year 2009 in Norway.

Incumbents
 Monarch – Harald V
 Prime Minister – Jens Stoltenberg (Norwegian Labour Party)

Events

January
 1 January:
 Same-sex marriage became legal in Norway when a gender neutral marriage bill was enacted after being passed by the Norwegian legislature in June 2008. Norway became the first Scandinavian country and the sixth country in the world to legalize same-sex marriage.
 A new Norwegian prostitution law (Sexkjøpsloven) bans the buying of sexual favours rather than selling (the client commits a crime, but not the prostitute).

February

March
 10 March – Varg Vikernes is released on parole having served almost 16 years of a 21 years (life) sentence for murder.

April

May

June

July
 31 July – Full City oil spill: the Panama-flagged bulk carrier, Full City, operated by COSCO, experienced engine failure and ran aground near Langesund, Telemark, Norway during a storm, spilling 200 tons of heavy bunker fuel oil in a sensitive wildlife area.

August

September
 14 September – The 2009 Parliamentary election takes place. Although the opposition received more votes, the governing Red-Green Coalition obtained more seats in parliament. This allowed Jens Stoltenberg to continue as prime minister.

October

November

December
 9 December – The Norwegian spiral anomaly initially shook thousands of witnesses in Northern Norway, as well as people across the globe, when what was later explained as a misfired Russian missile caused a spectacular light formation in the sky. The phenomenon was observed in the dark morning sky from Trøndelag through Finnmark.
 10 December – The 2009 Nobel Peace Prize was awarded to U.S. President Barack Obama in Oslo.

Full date unknown
InFiber, a Norwegian telecommunication company is founded.

Popular culture

Music

 16 May – Norway wins the Eurovision Song Contest 2009 with the song Fairytale performed by Alexander Rybak, with a record-breaking 387 points.

Sports

Film

Literature
Per Petterson is awarded the Nordic Council Literature Prize, for I Curse the River of Time.

Television

Anniversaries
 150 years since the birth of author Knut Hamsun on 4 August 1859
 100 years since the founding of the Norwegian Association of the Blind and Partially Sighted (Norges Blindeforbund) on 22 October 1909
 100 years since the establishment of the Norwegian National Academy of Fine Arts (Statens kunstakademi) on 29 November 1909
 75 years since the Tafjorden tsunami killed 41 people in Tafjord in Møre og Romsdal on 7 April 1934. The tsunami was triggered by landslide.

Notable deaths

January
2 January – John Olav Larssen, evangelical preacher and missionary (b. 1927)
3 January – 
 Torleiv Moren, painter (b. 1911)
 Kjelfrid Brusveen, cross-country skier (b. 1926)
4 January –
 Arvid Knutsen, soccer player and coach (b. 1944)
 Leif Herbrand Eriksen, journalist and politician (b. 1921)
 Odd Østbye, journalist and politician (b. 1925)
6 January –
 Magne Rommetveit, philologist (b. 1918)
 Eldar Hagen, ski salesman and sports official (b. 1918)
8 January – Björn Haugan, operatic lyric tenor
11 January – Jon Tvedt, mountain runner (b. 1966)
12 January –
 Jack Erik Kjuus, anti-immigration activist (b. 1927)
 Arne Næss, philosopher (b. 1912)
 Knut Eidem, journalist (b. 1918)
14 January – John Sveinsson, footballer (b. 1922)
17 January – Otto Birger Morcken, chess player (b. 1910)
21 January – Astrid Folstad, actress (b. 1932)
24 January –
 Kåre Berg, professor in medical genetics (b. 1932)
 Herman Pedersen, politician (b. 1928)
29 January –
 Olaf Øen, politician (b. 1925)
 Sjur Refsdal, astronomer (b. 1935)
31 January – Arne E. Holm, artist and architect (b. 1911)

February
1 February – Odd Torgeir Rusten, politician (b. 1925)
2 February – Fredrik Kayser, resistance member (b. 1918)
3 February – Åsa Solberg Iversen, politician (b. 1929)
4 February – Arnljot Eggen, lyricist (b. 1923)
8 February – Wenche Klouman Kerr, actress (b. 1918)
10 February – Eva Gustavson, opera singer (b. 1917, died in the US)
12 February – Willy Haugli, jurist and former Oslo chief of police (b. 1927)
14 February – Kjersti Graver, jurist and consumer ombudsman (b. 1945)
19 February – Jan E. Mellbye, agrarian leader (b. 1913)
21 February – Brynjulf Alver, folklorist (b. 1924)
23 February – Sverre Fehn, architect (b. 1924)
26 February – Ingebjørg Karmhus, politician (b. 1936)
28 February – Finn Christensen, artist (b. 1920)

March
4 March – Triztán Vindtorn, poet (b. 1942).
5 March – Bjørg Lødøen, artist (b. 1931)
6 March – Arild Eik, diplomat (b. 1943)
10 March – Geir Killingland, modeling agency executive (b. 1953).
13 March – Anne Brown, opera singer (b. 1912).
16 March – Mons Espelid, politician (b. 1926)
17 March – Jan Mohr, geneticist (b. 1921)
23 March – Lars Arentz-Hansen, barrister (b. 1927)
24 March – Ole Edvard Borgen, Methodist leader (b. 1925)
25 March – Knut Selmer, law professor (b. 1924)
26 March – Arne Bendiksen, singer, composer and producer (b. 1926).
28 March – Inger Lise Gjørv, politician (b. 1938)

April
2 April – Guttorm Hansen, writer and politician (b. 1920)
4 April – Jone Vadla, politician (b. 1923)
5 April –
 Ole Gabriel Ueland, politician (b. 1931)
 Reidun Røed, resistance member (b. 1921)
12 April –
 Hans Kleppen, ski jumper (b. 1907)
 Jens Balchen, civil engineer (b. 1926)
16 April –
 Svein Longva, economist and civil servant (b. 1943)
 Bjørg Berg, author (b. 1926)
18 April – Thor Hernes, footballer and sports official (b. 1926)
20 April – Ola M. Steinholt, bishop (b. 1934)
26 April –
 Ivar Ramstad, discus thrower (b. 1924)
 Geir Hovig, radio presenter (b. 1944)
29 April – Steinar Lem, environmentalist (b. 1951)
30 April – Bjørn Lothe, politician (b. 1952)

May
1 May – Torstein Grythe, conductor (b. 1918)
2 May – Herbert Svenkerud, translator (b. 1927)
12 May – Thomas Nordseth-Tiller, screenwriter (b. 1980)
13 May – Berit Erbe, actor and theatre historian (b. 1923)
19 May – Sjur Brækhus, law professor (b. 1918)
20 May – Randi Lindtner Næss, actress and singer (b. 1905)
22 May – Asle Sjåstad, alpine skier (b. 1930)

25 May –
 Haakon Lie, politician (b. 1905)
 Rolf Brahde, astronomer (b. 1919)
31 May – Ingebjørg Sem, actress (b. 1931)

June
1 June – Åse Fosli, politician (b. 1924)
3 June – 
 Geir Høgsnes, sociologist (b. 1950)
 Olav S. Platou, architect (b. 1918)
9 June – Arne Tovik, newspaper editor and journalist (b. 1956)
11 June – Jakob Kjersem, long-distance runner (b. 1925)
14 June – Ragnar Frislid, writer, photographer and environmentalist (b. 1926)
17 June – Erik Naggum, programmer (b. 1965)
18 June – Elisabeth Schweigaard Selmer, politician and judge (b. 1923)
22 June –
 Kaare Langlete, lord chamberlain (b. 1931)
 Anders Bye, novelist (b. 1933)
30 June – Mosse Jørgensen, education reform activist (b. 1921)

July
1 July – Gerd Vollum, politician (b. 1920)
4 July – Hildur Odlaug Os, politician (b. 1913)
6 July – Marius Eriksen, skier, fighter pilot, model and actor (b. 1922)
9 July –
 Ole Johannes Kløv, politician (b. 1925)
 Egil Arne Braathen, billionaire (b. 1917)
10 July – Ebba Haslund, author (b. 1917)
17 July – Per Meinich, economist (b. 1931)
24 July – Terje Moe, architect (b. 1933)
25 July – Erling Kristiansen, cyclist (b. 1932)
28 July – Kjell Colding, diplomat and politician (b. 1931)

August
3 August – Oddvar Korme, journalist (b. 1925)
4 August – Ole A. Sørli, manager and record producer (b. 1946)
5 August – Bjarne Berg-Sæther, politician (b. 1919)
8 August – Pål Kraby, barrister and businessman (b. 1932)
9 August –
 Leif Husebye, newspaper editor (b. 1926)
 Vince Sulyok, librarian and poet (b. 1932)
14 August – Torstein Slungård, politician (b. 1931)
24 August – Leif Flengsrud, cyclist (b. 1922)
26 August –
 Birger Skeie, businessman (b. 1951)
 Per Christensen, actor (b. 1934)
28 August – Ernst Magne Johansen, painter (b. 1926)
29 August – Inger Johanne Nossum, rector (b. 1930)
30 August –
 Kiki Sørum, fashion journalist (b. 1939)
 Åse Wentzel, singer (b. 1924)
31 August –
 Aksel Fossen, politician (b. 1919)
 Asbjørn Aarseth, philologist (b. 1935)

September
1 September – Per Nyhaug, jazz drummer (b. 1926)
4 September – Kåre Karlsen, politician (b. 1930)
7 September – Torstein Tranøy, journalist (b. 1964)
15 September – Torfinn Bjørnaas, resistance member (b. 1914)
17 September – Christian Petersen, ice hockey player (b. 1937)
22 September –
 Olaf Dufseth, skier (b. 1917)
 Ada Madssen, sculptor (b. 1917)
27 September – Martha Schrøder, politician (b. 1918)
28 September – Elisabeth Bang, actress (b. 1922)
29 September – Gunnar Haugan, actor (b. 1925)

October
1 October – Gunnar Haarberg, television presenter (b. 1917)
1 October – Bjarne Karsten Vatne, politician (b. 1926)
9 October –
 Arne Bakker, football and bandy player (b. 1930)
 Paul Reine, politician (b. 1932)
13 October – Atle Jebsen, ship-owner (b. 1935)
14 October – Hans Chr. Mamen, local historian and priest (b. 1919)
15 October – Tollak B. Sirnes, physician, psychiatrist and pharmacologist (b. 1922)
17 October – 
 Kurt Nordbø, politician (b. 1931)
 Egil Oddvar Larsen, politician (b. 1923)
20 October – Carl Fredrik Lowzow, politician (b. 1927)
21 October – Wilhelm Elsrud, forester (b. 1921)
23 October – Ragnvald Høier, physicist (b. 1938)
25 October – Gerhard Knoop, theatre director (b. 1920)
27 October – Marit Trætteberg, chemist (b. 1930)
29 October – Olav Hodne, missionary (b. 1921)

November
5 November – Nini Anker Dessen, textile artist (b. 1937)
6 November – Kjell Bartholdsen, jazz musician (b. 1938)
7 November – Arne Natland, footballer (b. 1927)
11 November – Helge Reiss, actor (b. 1928)
12 November – Elisabeth Aasen, politician (b. 1922)
16 November – Anne-Sofie Strømnæs, resistance member (b. 1920)
20 November – Leiv Erdal, politician (b. 1915)
21 November – Gerhard Aspheim, trombonist (b. 1930)
22 November – Eva Sivertsen, philologist (b. 1922)
24 November – Alexander Pihl, professor of medicine (b. 1920)
28 November – Bjartmar Gjerde, politician (b. 1931)

December
3 December –
 Åsmund L. Strømnes, educationalist (b. 1927)
 Lulla Einrid Fossland, politician (b. 1917)
9 December – Mia Berner, writer (b. 1923)
9 December – Kjell Eugenio Laugerud García, Norwegian-born President of Guatemala (b. 1930, died in Guatemala)
11 December –
 Erland Steenberg, politician (b. 1919)
 Karl Erik Zachariassen, zoologist (b. 1942)
12 December – Josef Monsrud, resistance member (b. 1922)
13 December – Arne Næss, politician (b. 1925)
15 December – Per Ulven, harness racing coach (b. 1925)
18 December – Sidsel Tone Berntsberg, sculptor (b. 1947)
21 December – Johan E. Holand, journalist and politician (b. 1919)
25 December – Knut Haugland, resistance member and explorer (b. 1917)
26 December –
 Peder Lunde, yacht racer (b. 1918)
 Tarald Weisteen, colonel (b. 1916)
 Odd Kirkeby, politician (b. 1923)
29 December –
 Ottar Landfald, politician (b. 1919)
 Harold Nicolaisen, politician (b. 1929)
30 December – Anne Valen Hestetun, politician (b. 1920)
31 December – Rodney Riise, ice hockey player (b. 1942)

Full date unknown
Fritz Hodne, historian (b. 1932)
Bjørn Heggelund, police chief (b. 1924)
Roar Stub Andersen, resistance member (b. 1921)
Arvid Berglind, politician (b. 1924)
Per Ulriksen, politician (b. 1937)
Robert Bergsaker, missionary (b. 1914)
Alf Blyverket, musician (b. 1929)
Tore Brantenberg, architect and writer (b. 1934)
Finn Sollie, political scientist (b. 1928)
Jan Erik Stenberg, Paralympic athlete (b. 1944)
Thorstein Thelle, popular writer (b. 1913)
Kåre I. Torp, industrialist (b. 1923)
Nils Viker, nature writer (b. 1911)
Inger Vonheim, short story writer (b. 1943)
Sverre Kongshavn, politician (b. 1926)
Hans Fredrik Marthinussen, judge (b. 1918)
Bernt Daniel Odfjell, ship-owner (b. 1908)
Ivar Bjerknes, painter (b. 1922)

See also
 2009-2010 flu pandemic in Norway
 2009 in Norwegian music

References

External links